Winterburn Reservoir is located near the village of Winterburn in Malhamdale, North Yorkshire, England. It was constructed between 1885 and 1893 by Leeds civil engineers Henry Rofe and Edward Filliter to help maintain levels on the Leeds and Liverpool Canal. The cost of construction was estimated at £45,000.

In order to maintain the water levels of Winterburn and Eshton Beck, there is a compensation scheme. Around  of water are discharged per day. The amount of compensation water is measured in the gauge house below the reservoir and further downstream at Holme Bridge lock, Gargrave.

In order to maintain the aquatic life in the reservoir, this is monitored daily, and in times of drought the water discharged into Winterburn Beck is reduced.

See also 

 Canals of the United Kingdom
 History of the British canal system

References

External links 

 Winterburn history pages

Canal reservoirs in England
Reservoirs in North Yorkshire